Dichlorine monoxide is an inorganic compound with the molecular formula Cl2O. It was first synthesised in 1834 by Antoine Jérôme Balard, who along with Gay-Lussac also determined its composition. In older literature it is often referred to as chlorine monoxide, which can be a source of confusion as that name now refers to the ClO• radical.

At room temperature it exists as a brownish-yellow gas which is soluble in both water and organic solvents. Chemically, it is a member of the chlorine oxide family of compounds, as well as being the anhydride of hypochlorous acid. It is a strong oxidiser and chlorinating agent.

Preparation
The earliest method of synthesis was to treat mercury(II) oxide with chlorine gas. However, this method is expensive, as well as highly dangerous due to the risk of mercury poisoning.

2 Cl2 + HgO → HgCl2 + Cl2O

A safer and more convenient method of production is the reaction of chlorine gas with hydrated sodium carbonate at 20–30 °C.

2 Cl2 + 2 Na2CO3 + H2O → Cl2O + 2 NaHCO3 + 2 NaCl

2 Cl2 + 2 NaHCO3 → Cl2O + 2 CO2 + 2 NaCl + H2O

This reaction can be performed in the absence of water but requires heating to 150–250 °C; as dichlorine monoxide is unstable at these temperatures it must therefore be continuously removed to prevent thermal decomposition.
2 Cl2 + Na2CO3 → Cl2O + CO2 + 2 NaCl

Structure
The structure of dichlorine monoxide is similar to that of water and hypochlorous acid, with the molecule adopting a bent molecular geometry (due to the lone pairs on the oxygen atom) and resulting in C2V molecular symmetry. The bond angle is slightly larger than normal, likely due to steric repulsion between the bulky chlorine atoms.

In the solid state, it crystallises in the tetrahedral space group I41/amd, making it isostructural to the high pressure form of water, ice VIII.

Reactions
Dichlorine monoxide is highly soluble in water, where it exists in an equilibrium with HOCl. The rate of hydrolysis is slow enough to allow the extraction of Cl2O with organic solvents such as CCl4, but the equilibrium constant ultimately favours the formation of hypochlorous acid.

2 HOCl ⇌ Cl2O + H2O     K (0 °C) = 3.55x10−3 dm3/mol

Despite this, it has been suggested that dichlorine monoxide may be the active species in the reactions of HOCl with olefins and aromatic compounds, as well as in the chlorination of drinking water.

With inorganic compounds
Dichlorine monoxide reacts with metal halides, with the loss of Cl2, to form unusual oxyhalides.

VOCl3 + Cl2O → VO2Cl + 2 Cl2
TiCl4 + Cl2O → TiOCl2 + 2 Cl2
SbCl5 + 2 Cl2O → SbO2Cl + 4 Cl2

Similar reactions have also been observed with certain inorganic halides.

AsCl3 + 2 Cl2O → AsO2Cl + 3 Cl2
NOCl + Cl2O → NO2Cl + Cl2

With organic compounds
Dichlorine monoxide is an effective chlorinating agent. It can be used for either the side-chain or ring chlorination of deactivated aromatic substrates. For activated aromatics such as phenols and aryl-ethers it primarily reacts to give ring halogenated products. It has been suggested that dichlorine monoxide may be the active species in the reactions of HOCl with olefins and aromatic compounds.

Photochemistry
Dichlorine monoxide undergoes photodissociation, eventually forming O2 and Cl2. The process is primarily radical based, with flash photolysis showing radical hypochlorite (ClO·) to be a key intermediate.

2 Cl2O → 2 Cl2 + O2

Explosive properties
Dichlorine monoxide is explosive, although there is a lack of modern research into this behaviour. Room temperature mixtures with oxygen could not be detonated by an electric spark until they contained at least 23.5% Cl2O which is an exceedingly high minimum explosive limit. There are conflicting reports of it exploding on exposure to strong light. Heating above 120 °C, or a rapid rate of heating at lower temperatures also apparently lead to explosions.
Liquid dichlorine monoxide has been reported to be shock-sensitive.

References

Chlorine oxides
Gases with color
Explosive chemicals
Chlorine(I) compounds